Mario Tičinović (born 20 August 1991) is a Croatian footballer who plays as a winger for Bosnian Premier League club Zrinjski Mostar.

He has amassed a total 44 youth caps for Croatia under six different age groups.

Club career

Hajduk Split
Tičinović began his playing career at Hajduk Split, he didn't graduate from all the youth levels of Hajduk. That decision would later affect his career. His first game for Hajduk was on 3 August 2008 against Varteks, he came on for Mladen Bartolović which made him at that time the youngest player ever that debuted for Hajduk on senior level with only 16 years of age. The game ended in a one all draw. Tičinović scored his first goal for the team in a 4–0 win over Birkirkara, becoming the youngest Hajduk's scorer in European competitions ever. Tičinović was often hailed by the media as the new Croatian star and was expected to make a significant international career. Despite his talent he did manage to find himself in the starting 11 and was mostly used as a substitute which affected him negatively.

In 2008, he suffered an injury which kept him of the field for nearly 1 year. In 2009 under manager Edoardo Reja he was used more often in the first team but after suffering another injury during the winter preparations in Marbella he paused for 2 months and after Reja left the club Tičinović found himself again on the bench. He won the Croatian Cup in 2010.
In the following season he joined Karlovac on loan but after 6 months he returned to Hajduk again to find himself with minor minutes on the field.

In 2011, manager Krasimir Balakov came to Hajduk and started using young Tičinović as a left back. He did not prove himself to the new manager and was used again as a late substitute. In November 2011 Tičinović was kicked from the first team for breaking the door in the club restaurant and for disrespecting manager Balakov. He was given the status as a not needed player and was loaned to F.C. Nordsjælland. Finally he was sold to them at the end of the season.

Nordsjælland
In January 2012, Tičinović was loaned to Danish club Nordsjælland for the rest of the season. He would make 11 appearances and score 1 goal during his loan spell, helping the Farum club win their first Danish Superliga championship.

On 1 June 2012, Nordsjælland confirmed the purchase of Tičinović from Hajduk Split who signed a three-year contract.

Lokeren
On 9 July 2015, it was confirmed that Tičinović had signed a four-year contract with Belgian club Lokeren.

On 31 January 2019, it was announced, that Tičinović, Julian Michel and Đorđe Jovanović had been promoted to reserve team due to a lack of commitment. The club was in a very bad position, which with 7 matches to go was very close to relegation. On 4 March 2019, Tičinović got his contract terminated by mutual consent.

Zrinjski Mostar
On 5 July 2019, Tičinović signed with Bosnian Premier League club Zrinjski Mostar on a free transfer. He made his official debut for Zrinjski on 25 July 2019, in a 1–1 away draw against Utrecht in the 2019–20 UEFA Europa League second qualifying round.

Honours
Hajduk Split
Croatian Cup: 2009–10

Nordsjælland
Danish Superliga: 2011–12

Zrinjski Mostar
Bosnian Premier League: 2021–22

References

External links
 

1991 births
Living people
People from Sinj
Association football fullbacks
Association football wingers
Croatian footballers
Croatia youth international footballers
Croatia under-21 international footballers
HNK Hajduk Split players
NK Karlovac players
FC Nordsjælland players
K.S.C. Lokeren Oost-Vlaanderen players
HŠK Zrinjski Mostar players
Croatian Football League players
Danish Superliga players
Belgian Pro League players
Premier League of Bosnia and Herzegovina players
Croatian expatriate footballers
Expatriate men's footballers in Denmark
Expatriate footballers in Belgium
Expatriate footballers in Bosnia and Herzegovina
Croatian expatriate sportspeople in Denmark
Croatian expatriate sportspeople in Belgium
Croatian expatriate sportspeople in Bosnia and Herzegovina